Kremser is a surname. Notable people with the surname include:

 Friedrich Kremser (born 1942), Austrian retired footballer
 Karl Kremser (born 1945), American football placekicker
 Manfred Kremser (1950–2013), Austrian ethnologist
 Thomas Kremser, poker professional

See also
 Kremser SC, Austrian football club